"What's Holding Me" is a single by Canadian country music artist George Fox. Released in 1995, it was the first single from his album Time of My Life. The song reached #1 on the RPM Country Tracks chart in April 1995.

Chart performance

Year-end charts

References

1995 singles
George Fox songs
Song recordings produced by Bob Gaudio
Songs written by George Fox (singer)
Songs written by Kim Tribble
Warner Music Group singles
1995 songs